Urwick is a surname. Notable people with the surname include:

 Lyndall Urwick (1891–1983), British management consultant and business thinker
 Alan Urwick (1930–2016), British diplomat
 William Urwick the elder (1791–1868), English congregational minister in Ireland
 William Urwick the younger (1826–1905), Anglo-Irish nonconformist minister, son of William Urwick the elder
 Reginald Urwick (1876–1964), British philatelist